is a Japanese photographer and creator of the magazines STREET, TUNE, and FRUiTS. He also subsequently created the Fruits and Fresh Fruits (collections of Japanese street fashion) photo-books as a way of offering his photos to the foreign market.

Life and work
Aoki was born in Tokyo. He began documenting street fashion in Tokyo's fashionable Harajuku area in the mid 1990s when he noticed a marked change in the way young people were dressing. Rather than following European and American trends, people were customising elements of traditional Japanese dress—kimono, obi sashes and geta sandals—and combining them with handmade, secondhand and alternative designer fashion in an innovative DIY approach to dressing.

In 1997, Aoki founded the monthly magazine FRUiTS, now a cult fanzine with an international following, to record and celebrate the freshness of fashion in Harajuku.

Publications

Magazines
 STREET (began in 1985)
 FRUiTS. (began in 1997)
 TUNE (began in 2004)
 .RUBY (began in 2012)

Books
Fruits. Phaidon, 2001. .
Fresh Fruits. Phaidon, 2005. .
Street London 1985-1996. 2017.

References

External links
ABC interview with Aoki

Japanese editors
People from Tokyo
20th-century Japanese photographers
21st-century Japanese photographers
Living people
Year of birth missing (living people)